Wensleydale is the dale or upper valley of the River Ure on the east side of the Pennines, one of the Yorkshire Dales in North Yorkshire, England.

It is one of only a few Yorkshire Dales not currently named after its principal river, but the older name, Yoredale, can still be seen on some maps and as the Yoredale Series of geological strata. The dale takes its name from the village of Wensley, once its market town.

The valley is famous for its cheese, with the main commercial production at Hawes.  Also famous are its ales from Theakston Brewery and Black Sheep Brewery in Masham. Most of the dale is within the Yorkshire Dales National Park. Part of lower Wensleydale, below East Witton, is within the Nidderdale Area of Outstanding Natural Beauty.

History

Wensleydale was the home of one of Yorkshire's most famous clans, the Metcalfes, after they emigrated from Dentdale. The Metcalfe Society hold records dating back to Metcalfes living in the area during the 14th century. They were one of the most prominent families in Yorkshire for more than five centuries.  Sir James Metcalfe (1389–1472), who was born and lived in Wensleydale, was a captain in the army which fought with King Henry V in the battle of Agincourt in 1415. A fortified manor, Nappa Hall near Askrigg was built by his son Sir Thomas Metcalfe.

Bolton Castle, in the village of Castle Bolton, is a notable local historic site. 
Building of the structure was begun by Richard le Scrope, Lord Treasurer and Lord Chancellor to Richard II, in 1378. The building was finally completed in c.1399; the total cost was approximately 18,000 marks.  Mary, Queen of Scots, was imprisoned there for six months, ending in January 1569, under head keeper Sir Francis Knollys, housed in the apartment of Henry Scrope; she was allowed a retinue of 51, with 30 housed in the castle. The story goes that she once escaped and made her way towards Leyburn but was captured at a spot on "The Shawl" called "Queen's Gap".

Geography

Wensleydale's principal settlements are Hawes and Leyburn; Aysgarth, Bainbridge, and Middleham are well-known villages. The shortest river in England, the River Bain, links Semerwater to the River Ure, at Bainbridge, the home to an Ancient Roman fort (part of the Roman road is walkable, up Wether Fell). Hardraw Force, the highest above-ground unbroken waterfall in England, is located at Hardraw, near Hawes.

Aysgarth Falls (High, Middle, Low) are famous for their beauty (rather than their height), attracting far-off visitors; they were also featured in the film Robin Hood: Prince of Thieves. Some scenes from the 1992 film Wuthering Heights were also filmed at the falls. Other notable waterfalls are at Wensley (Harmby Falls), West Burton, and Whitfield Gill Force, near Askrigg.

It lies between Wharfedale (to the south), and the quieter Swaledale (to the north, via Buttertubs Pass). Several lesser-known dales are branches of Wensleydale:  on the north side Cotterdale, Fossdale and Apedale and on the south side, from west to east, Widdale, Sleddale, Raydale, Bishopdale, Waldendale and Coverdale.

Below Wensleydale, the River Ure flows east and south, becomes navigable, changes its name to the River Ouse, passes through York, becomes the Humber Estuary, flows under the Humber Bridge past Hull, Immingham, and  Grimsby, and meets the North Sea off Spurn Head. On the way it collects the waters of the River Swale, River Nidd, River Wharfe, River Aire, River Derwent and River Trent.

Tourism

Wensleydale is a very popular destination in its own right, enhanced by its central location between two other well-known tourist dales: Wharfedale and the quieter Swaledale.

Wensleydale is a common destination for visitors who like walking on mountains, moorland, dale-sides, and valley bottoms. Hawes and Leyburn are popular because of their age, location and facilities (pubs, shops, teashops, and hotels). Hawes is the home of rope maker (Outhwaites), where visitors can see the manufacturing process. Hawes
is also home to the Wensleydale Creamery, the Dales Countryside Museum, shops and many of places to eat. Part of Bolton Castle is a ruin but the other section has been restored; this attraction had a 4.5-star rating in mid 2018 by the users of TripAdvisor who had visited the castle.

The Wensleydale Railway operates in Wensleydale. It currently runs between Leeming Bar, the A1 and Redmire, near Castle Bolton. The railway's long-term plan is eventually to run the whole length of the valley and connect again with the National Rail network at both ends: at Garsdale on the Settle-Carlisle Railway in the west and Northallerton on the East Coast Main Line in the east. It is hoped this may help relieve some of the current traffic congestion that the valley suffers from during the busiest months.

Some visitors come to Wensleydale due to its connection with Richard III, who was brought up in Middleham Castle. It has the largest castle keep in the North of England.  Middleham itself is a market town with pubs and horse-racing connections (several stables). In the market place stands a stone carving, believed to be a boar's head, signifying where the animal market was during the 15th century as well as representing Richard's personal standard, the white boar.

Each August, visitors and local people gather at the edge of Leyburn for the Wensleydale Agricultural Show. The 2018 event was scheduled for 25 August.

References

 
Valleys of North Yorkshire